Roots (1958) is the second play by Arnold Wesker in The Wesker Trilogy. The first part is Chicken Soup with Barley and the final play is I'm Talking about Jerusalem. Roots focuses on Beatie Bryant as she makes the transition from being an uneducated working-class woman obsessed with Ronnie, her unseen liberal boyfriend, to a woman who can express herself and the struggles of her time. It is written in the Norfolk dialect of the people on which it focuses, and is considered to be one of Wesker's kitchen sink dramas. Roots was first presented at the Belgrade Theatre, Coventry, in May 1959 with Joan Plowright in the lead before transferring to the Royal Court Theatre, London.

Plot

Act 1
Beatie arrives back in her native Norfolk to stay with her sister.

Act 2
Beatie visits her parents.

Act 3
Beatie and her family await Ronnie's arrival, until a letter arrives from him announcing he is leaving Beatie.

Excerpt
"Do you think we really count? You don' wanna take any notice of what them ole papers say about the workers bein' all-important these days – that's all squit! 'Cos we aren't. Do you think when the really talented people in the country get to work they get to work for us? Hell if they do? Do you think they don't know we 'ont make the effort? The writers don't write thinkin' we can understand, nor the painters don't paint expectin' us to be interested – that they don't, nor don't the composers give out music thinkin' we can appreciate it. 'Blust,' they say, 'the masses is too stupid for us to come down to them. Blust,' they say, 'if they don't make no effort why should we bother?' So you know who come along? The slop singers and the pop writers and the film makers and the women's magazines and the tabloid papers and the picture-strip love stories – thaas who come along, and you don't hev to make no effort for them, it come easy… The whole stinkin' commercial world insults us and we don't care a damn. Well Ronnie's right – it's our own bloody fault. We want the third-rate – we got it!"

Notable productions
Gene Wilder made his off-Broadway debut in the 1961 New York City production as Frankie Bryant.

In 2008 Jo Combes directed a production at the Royal Exchange, Manchester, with Denise Black as Mrs Bryant and Claire Brown as Beatie Bryant. Black won a MEN Award for her performance.

References

Plays by Arnold Wesker
1958 plays
Norfolk in fiction